Adolph Northen (also credited as Adolf Northen, Adolf Northern or Adolph Northern) (6 November 1828 – 28 May 1876) was a German painter.

He was born in Münden, Kingdom of Hanover and was a member of Düsseldorf school of painting.

Chiefly depicting battle scenes and particularly events of the Napoleonic Wars, Northen's most noted works include 
Napoleon's Retreat from Russia which depicts the failure of the 1812 invasion of Russia by Napoleon
Prussian Attack at Plancenoit, showing the Prussian divisions of Hiller, Ryssel and Tippelskirch defeating the French Imperial Young Guard, 1st Battalions of the 2nd Grenadiers and 2nd Chasseurs at the Battle of Waterloo.

Northern died in Düsseldorf aged 48.

Works

References

Printed sources:

 Champlin, John Denison Cyclopedia of Painters and Paintings, 2005
 Krafft, Eva Maria Katalog der Meister des 19. Jahrhunderts in der Hamburger Kunsthalle, 1969

Websites:

 Artnet Adolf Northen retrieved 6 July 2007

Notes

19th-century German painters
German male painters
1828 births
1876 deaths
People from Hann. Münden
19th-century German male artists
Düsseldorf school of painting